Deana most often refers to Deana, a genus of moths.

Deana may also refer to:

Surname
 Steven Deana (b. 1990), Swiss professional footballer and goalkeeper

Given name
 Deana Carter (b. 1966), American country music singer-songwriter
 Deana Lawson (b. 1979), American artist, educator and photographer based in Brooklyn, New York
 Deana Martin, American singer and actress, daughter of singer Dean Martin
Deana Uppal (b. 1989), English beauty pageant titleholder, actress and business entrepreneur

See also
Deanna